Mărineşti may refer to:

 Mărineşti, a village in Întregalde Commune, Alba County, Romania
 Marineşti, a village in Crușeț Commune, Gorj County, Romania
 Mărineşti, a village in Ciutuleşti Commune, Floreşti district, Moldova
 Mărineşti, a village in Sîngereii Noi Commune, Sîngerei district, Moldova

See also 
 Marin (name)
 Marinescu (surname)